Great Hollow Lake is approximately  in size and is a part of William E. Wolfe Park, located in Monroe, Connecticut. Fishing, swimming and non-motorized boating are all permitted.

References

Lakes of Connecticut
Lakes of Fairfield County, Connecticut
Monroe, Connecticut